Where the Wild Roses Grow is a 2011 Austrian short film directed by Romana Carén, about the young woman Yasmina whose solitary life is changed by the mysterious stranger name Leon. The screenplay was semi-finalist of the 22nd WriteMovies.com International Writing Competition. The film was screened in the Short Film Corner of the 2012 Cannes Film Festival.

Plot
Traumatized by the untimely death of her brother when they both were children, Yasmina lives an isolated life in the village Angloville. One day a mysterious man comes to the village and invites her to a picnic in the woods. She decides to take the risk and finds a long hidden treasure.

Cast
 Katja Benrath – Yasmina
 Tony Matzl – Leon
 Kai Peterson – Herr Konrad
 Romana Carén – Julia
 Thomas Watzak – Manuel (voice)
 Geoffrey Dawes – Peter
 Maria Bambury – Maria
 Philipp Bambury – Philipp
 Julia Fürst – Dame
 Mark Mayr – junger Mann

References

External links 
 

2011 films
2011 short films
Films directed by Romana Carén
Austrian short films